Dormansville is a hamlet in Albany County, New York, United States. Dormansville used to have a post office with ZIP code 12055.

References

Hamlets in Albany County, New York
Hamlets in New York (state)